Li Yingjian (born 22 February 1991) is a Chinese footballer who currently plays for Shaanxi Chang'an Athletic in the China League One.

Club career
Li Yingjian started his football career in 2004 when he received organized football training at Dongguan Nancheng. He joined Chinese Super League side Shenzhen FC's youth academy in 2008. He was promoted to Shenzhen's first team squad in 2009. Li joined Guangzhou Evergrande in 2010 and played for the club's youth team Guangzhou Youth in the China League Two in the 2011 season. Li moved to fellow League Two club Shenzhen Fengpeng in 2012 after Guangzhou Youth was dissolved. He lost his position in the 2013 season after manager Zhang Jun left the club.

Li transferred to China League Two side Guizhou Zhicheng in January 2014, rejoining Zhang Jun. He made his Super League debut on 3 March 2017 in a 1–1 home draw against Liaoning FC, coming on as a substitute for Liang Xueming in the 78th minute.

On 1 March 2019, Li transferred to League One newcomer Shaanxi Chang'an Athletic.

Career statistics
.

References

External links
 

1991 births
Living people
Chinese footballers
Footballers from Foshan
People from Sanshui District
Association football forwards
Chinese Super League players
China League One players
China League Two players
Shenzhen F.C. players
Guizhou F.C. players
Shaanxi Chang'an Athletic F.C. players
21st-century Chinese people